Hambran is a village located in the Ludhiana West tehsil, of Ludhiana district, Punjab.

Hambran is a township in Punjab state in India. Located in the Ludhiana District close to Mullanpur Dakha, 17 Km ( 10 miles ) west of Ludhiana. 

In 2019 Panchayat Polling that the S.Ranjodh Singh alias jagga is elected as sarpanch of Hambran.

Administration
The village is administrated by a Sarpanch Ranjodh Singh Jagga who is an elected representative of village as per constitution of India and Panchayati raj (India).

Villages in Ludhiana West Tehsil

Air travel connectivity 
The closest airport to the village is Sahnewal Airport.

External links
  Villages in Ludhiana West Tehsil

References

Villages in Ludhiana West tehsil